The Hives are a Swedish rock band that rose to prominence in the early 2000s during the garage rock revival. Their mainstream success came with the release of the album Veni Vidi Vicious, containing the single "Hate to Say I Told You So". The band has been acclaimed by music critics as one of the best live rock bands.

The Hives have released five studio albums: Barely Legal (1997), Veni Vidi Vicious (2000), Tyrannosaurus Hives (2004), The Black and White Album (2007) and Lex Hives (2012). They have one compilation album, Your New Favourite Band (2001) and they have issued a live DVD, Tussles in Brussels (2005).

History

Beginnings of the Hives (1993–1999)
The band claims it was formed in 1993 (although formed in 1989 under a different name and sound) under the guidance of Randy Fitzsimmons. Fitzsimmons suggested that they form a garage rock band. He gave each band member a letter asking them to start the band. Fitzsimmons allegedly acts as a songwriter and manager for the band. The band recorded a demo titled Sounds Like Sushi in 1994. The following year they were signed to Burning Heart Records, a Swedish independent record label. The following year they released their debut EP Oh Lord! When? How? Almqvist decided to promote the band to Burning Heart.

In 1997 they released an album called Barely Legal (an early stage name of guitarist Vigilante Carlstroem), and began touring. The following year they released their second EP A.K.A. I-D-I-O-T.

The track "The Stomp" was featured on the soundtrack of the film RocknRolla.

Veni Vidi Vicious and Your New Favourite Band (2000–2002)
They released their second studio album Veni Vidi Vicious in April 2000 through Burning Heart Records. The band themselves described the album as being like "a velvet glove with brass knuckles, both brutal and sophisticated at the same time". The album yielded the singles "Hate to Say I Told You So", "Main Offender", "Die, All Right!", and "Supply and Demand."

After seeing the video for "Hate to Say I Told You So" on German TV, Alan McGee (Oasis, Creation Records) decided to sign the band to his newly formed Poptones label. Poptones released the 'best of' compilation Your New Favourite Band in 2001, which proved to be their breakthrough record, reaching No. 7 in the UK album charts. Following the success of the album, the band re-released singles "Hate to Say I Told You So" and "Main Offender" which reach numbers No. 23 and No. 24 respectively in the UK Singles chart. The band also re-released Veni Vidi Vicious in the US. "The Hives — Introduce the Metric System in Time" was included on the punk rock sampler album Punk-O-Rama Volume 5 from Epitaph Records.

It was during the promotion of Veni Vidi Vicious and Your New Favourite Band that the Hives signed a record deal with Universal Music, reportedly worth $50 million. This led to a dispute between the Hives and Burning Heart, who claimed that the Hives were still contracted to them for one more album.

The track "Main Offender" was featured in the video game Rock Band while "Die, All Right!" was released as downloadable content for the game's music store on Xbox 360, PlayStation 3 and Nintendo Wii. "Hate To Say I Told You So" was featured in Forza Horizon on the Xbox 360 and on the radio in Grand Theft Auto V .

Tyrannosaurus Hives (2003–2006)
After extensive touring, the band retreated to Fagersta to record their third album. The result was 2004's Tyrannosaurus Hives, their first new material in four years. The album includes the hit singles "Walk Idiot Walk," which debuted at No. 13 on the UK singles charts, "Two-Timing Touch and Broken Bones," another top 50 hit, and "A Little More for Little You." The tracks "B is for Brutus" and "Uptight" were featured in the game Gran Turismo 4, and "No Pun Intended" was featured in the game SSX on Tour. In 2006, their song "Diabolic Scheme" was used in the vampire film Frostbiten, marking the second time a Hives song was used in a major motion picture. ("Hate To Say I Told You So" featured in Spider-Man (2002).

The Hives won "Best International Band" and "Best Dressed Band" at the 2003 NME awards.

The band also won five prestigious Swedish Grammis for Tyrannosaurus Hives at the 23rd annual Swedish Grammis Awards, presented on 7 February 2005 for "Artist of the Year"; "Rock Group of the Year"; "Album of the Year"; "Producer of the Year" (with collaborator, Pelle Gunnerfeldt); and "Walk Idiot Walk" took home the MTV "Best Music Video" prize.

The Black and White Album (2007–2011)
The Hives' official website was overhauled in the second week of August 2007, with a grungier, "emergency broadcast" layout. The new site revealed the album's cover and the title of the first single, "Tick Tick Boom", with a release date of 14 August in the United States and 8 October in the United Kingdom. The release dates for the new record, The Black and White Album, were 15 October in the UK on Polydor and 13 November in the US on A&M/Octone in 2007. It was mostly recorded in Oxford, Mississippi, Miami, and in their native Sweden.

The Hives performed the song "Fall Is Just Something Grownups Invented" for Cartoon Network's 2007 Fall era.

The Hives were featured in a Finish Line commercial performing "Tick Tick Boom", as well as a Nike commercial featuring the song "Return The Favour". "Tick Tick Boom" was also used in many different advertisements including: the 2007 season of the NFL Network, commercials for the CBS series Jericho, and the USA series Burn Notice, as well as the films Jumper (2008), MacGruber, and Get Smart, and was also the official theme song for WWE Survivor Series 2007. The Hives song "Try It Again" was featured in the trailer for the US film Get Him to the Greek.

In 2008, iTunes (Apple Music) and Nike+ issued an entry in the Nike+ Original Run series entitled "Black, White and Run", consisting of the band's material remixed to play continuously for the duration of a workout.

On 9 January 2008, the band received the "Best Live Act" award at the Swedish Grammis.

The Hives performed at the 2008 NHL All-Star Game in Atlanta, Georgia, singing "Tick Tick Boom" during the players' presentation.

On 2 July 2010, the band released an EP titled Tarred and Feathered, which covered "Civilization's Dying" by Zero Boys, "Nasty Secretary" by Joy Rider & Avis Davis and "Early Morning Wake Up Call" by Flash and the Pan. "Nasty Secretary" is also a song on the US release of the Gran Turismo 5 soundtrack. On 9 January 2011, Nicholaus Arson wrote another short diary entry on the band's website saying that they had recorded some new songs before Christmas, and were planning to continue recording throughout January.

The album's first single, "Tick Tick Boom", was featured in the setlist for the music-simulation video game Lego: Rock Band.

Lex Hives and line-up change (2012–present)

On 12 March 2012, the band announced their fifth full-length album, Lex Hives. The album was released on their own label, Disque Hives on 1 June in Sweden/GSA, 4 June in the UK, and 5 June in the US and Canada, comprising twelve self-produced tracks, with a deluxe version containing bonus tracks produced by Queens of the Stone Age frontman Josh Homme.

The first single to be released from the album, "Go Right Ahead," was made available for public streaming alongside this announcement. Five teaser videos were posted on their official YouTube channel, each showing a member of the band playing their part of the song in the lead up to the announcement. The song was also played live at the Norwegian/Swedish talkshow "Skavlan", broadcast on 30 March 2012.

After a run of Californian live shows and the two weekends at the Coachella Valley Music and Arts Festival (15 and 22 April), the band performed on Jimmy Kimmel Live! on 23 April 2012. The music video for "Go Right Ahead" was released on 9 May 2012.

Since its release, "Come On!" has been used as the theme for Xbox One's Invitation commercials, as well as in an episode of Workaholics and in the documentary The Crash Reel. The song "1000 Answers," meanwhile, was featured on the soundtrack of the video game by EA Sports, FIFA 12.

Due to health reasons, Dr. Matt Destruction left the band in late 2013 and was replaced by Randy bassist Johan Gustafsson, who then went by the stage name The Johan and Only.

On 13 February 2015, the band released the single "Blood Red Moon".

The single "I'm Alive" was released digitally on 17 May 2019, with a limited edition 7-inch vinyl available on 28 June. This was followed by another single later that year, "Good Samaritan." The band toured the US in 2019 alongside fellow Swedish band Refused, with the run of dates dubbed the Scream Team Tour. Chris Dangerous took a hiatus from the band to recover from surgery, and was replaced on the tour by former Queens of the Stone Age drummer Joey Castillo.

The Hives' first live album, Live at Third Man Records, was released on 25 September 2020.

Collaborations
The Hives completed recording vocals and guitar in late November 2006 for a song called "Throw It On Me", a collaboration with hip-hop producer Timbaland. The song was included on his album, Timbaland Presents Shock Value, released on 3 April 2007. They also performed in a music video for the track. The Hives also have recently spoken of a collaboration with Jack White's the Raconteurs on a song for their new album, originally entitled "Footsteps", however it was later revealed that Howlin' Pelle had literally recorded footsteps. Howlin' Pelle also did a collaboration with Swedish rock artist Moneybrother, a cover of an Operation Ivy song "Freeze Up". They used Swedish lyrics and called it "", which translates as "I Won't Sign Anything".

The band members contributed to "Time For Some Action" and "Windows" on N.E.R.D.'s "Seeing Sounds" album, with Pelle Almqvist providing guest vocals on "Time For Some Action". On Seeing Sounds, they are credited with their real names instead of the pseudonyms they use within the band.

In 2008 the band recorded a Christmas duet entitled "A Christmas Duel" with Cyndi Lauper, which was available as a free download from their website on 28 November 2008.

In a November 2008 interview with leading Swedish newspaper Dagens Nyheter, Swedish rapper Petter announced that the Hives were working on a new version of his track "Repa skivan" for his upcoming album.

Style and onstage performance

All songwriting except covers on the band's albums are credited to "Randy Fitzsimmons". The band claim Fitzsimmons is an honorary "sixth Hive," who along with writing their music, discovered and manages the band. The band has included hidden references to a sixth member of the band, including a hidden sixth pair of legs on the back cover of the Tyrannosaurus Hives album art. Randy Fitzsimmons is a registered pseudonym for Niklas Almqvist.

The Hives live shows have been highly rated, with Spin magazine rating them 8th best in rock music. Pelle is known for his "colourful idiocy" on stage. When asked about their efforts to connect with the audience, Chris Dangerous replied that "there are so many bands out there that don’t say a word to the crowd. I don’t get it. They don’t even look at the audience and that’s ridiculous". The Hives always dressed in matching black-and-white tuxedos because "it makes [them] look like [they] belong together".

Band members
Current members
Howlin' Pelle Almqvist (Per Almqvist) – lead vocals (1993–present)
Nicholaus Arson (Niklas Almqvist) – lead guitar, backing vocals (1993–present)
Vigilante Carlstroem (Mikael Karlsson) – rhythm guitar, backing vocals (1993–present)
Chris Dangerous (Christian Grahn) – drums, percussion (1993–present; hiatus 2019)
The Johan and Only (Johan Gustafsson) – bass guitar (2013–present)

Former members
Dr. Matt Destruction (Mattias Bernvall) – bass guitar (1993–2013)

Former touring musicians
Joey Castillo – drums (2019)

Discography

Studio albums
 Barely Legal (1997)
Veni Vidi Vicious (2000)
Tyrannosaurus Hives (2004)
The Black and White Album (2007)
Lex Hives (2012)

References

External links

 
Epitaph Records artists
Swedish garage rock groups
Garage punk groups
Swedish indie rock groups
Swedish punk rock groups
Musical quintets
Burning Heart Records artists
Swedish rock music groups
Musical groups established in 1989
Sibling musical groups
Swedish pop music groups
MTV Europe Music Award winners
English-language singers from Sweden
Post-punk revival music groups
Polydor Records artists
Sire Records artists
Interscope Records artists
Gearhead Records artists
Columbia Records artists
Universal Music Group artists
Sony Music artists
A&M Octone Records artists